Stanisław Kazimierz Nagy, SCI (30 September 1921 – 5 June 2013) was a Polish member of the Priests of the Sacred Heart of Jesus (Dehonians) and a cardinal. He was born in 1921 in Bieruń, Silesia, Poland, to a Hungarian father and Polish mother. In 1937 he became a member of the Dehonian Congregation and was ordained a priest in 1945. He was a rector in Kraków-Płaszów, in Tarnów and a professor at the Catholic University of Lublin.

In the early 1970s Nagy served on the International Theological Commission, the Joint-Catholic-Lutheran Commission and on the editorial staff of the Catholic Encyclopedia. He attended Synods in 1981 and 1985 as well as writing books on ecumenism and Pope John Paul II. He was consecrated as Archbishop and was created Cardinal-Deacon of Santa Maria della Scala on 21 October 2003. Cardinal Nagy died on 5 June 2013 in Kraków, Poland.

References

External links

The Cardinals of the Holy Roman Church-Stanislaw Nagy

1921 births
2013 deaths
People from Bieruń-Lędziny County
Dehonian bishops
Polish Roman Catholic titular archbishops
21st-century Polish cardinals
International Theological Commission
Cardinals created by Pope John Paul II
Polish people of Hungarian descent